The Expectations Tour is Hayley Kiyoko's fourth headlining tour in support of her first studio album Expectations. The tour began in San Diego on April 11, 2018, and was set to conclude in Iceland on November 7, 2018. Jess Kent and Naaz performed as opening acts.

Critical reception
Billboard praised Kiyoko for her "strong vocals and beast dance moves." In addition, she was praised for her stage presence and candor about sexuality and identity.

Setlist
This set list is from the concert on June 5, 2018, in Cleveland, Ohio. It is not intended to represent all shows from the tour.

 "Gatekeeper" (intro)
 "Under the Blue/Take Me In"
 "What I Need"
 "Girls Like Girls"
 "He'll Never Love You (HNLY)"
 "Molecules"
 "Mercy" 
 "Ease my Mind"
 "This Side of Paradise"
 "Palm Dreams"
 "Wanna Be Missed"
 "Pretty Girl"
 "Sleepover"
 "Curious"
 "Feelings"
 "Let It Be"
 "Gatekeeper" (outro)
 "Gravel to Tempo"

Tour dates

References

External links
 Official website

2018 concert tours
2019 concert tours
Concert tours of North America
Concert tours of the United States
Concert tours of Canada
Concert tours of Europe
Concert tours of the United Kingdom